Richard Rusczyk (born September 21, 1971) is the founder and chief executive officer of Art of Problem Solving Inc. (as well as the website, which serves as a mathematics forum and place to hold online classes) and a co-author of the Art of Problem Solving textbooks. Rusczyk was a national Mathcounts participant in 1985, and he won the USA Math Olympiad (USAMO) in 1989. He is one of the co-creators of the Mandelbrot Competition, and the director of the USA Mathematical Talent Search (USAMTS). He also founded the San Diego Math Circle. Every month, Rusczyk works on the Mathcounts website to create Mathcounts Minis, where he explains problems and concepts.

Art of Problem Solving 

In 1994, Rusczyk and Sandor Lehoczky wrote the Art of Problem Solving books, designed to prepare students for mathematical competitions by teaching them concepts and problem-solving methods rarely taught in school. These books lent their name to the company he founded in 2003.

After working for four years as a bond trader for D. E. Shaw & Co., Rusczyk created the Art of Problem Solving website, which provides resources for middle and high school students to develop their mathematics and problem-solving abilities. These include real-time competitions to solve math problems and online tools to learn how to solve problems with increasing difficulty as well as math forums. As of May 26, 2021, there have been 709,491 students, 1,322,594 topics, and a total of 15,182,054 posts on the site. Rusczyk has also published the Art of Problem Solving series of books aimed at a similar audience. The site also provides fee-based online mathematics classes, which range from Prealgebra to Group Theory and Calculus. Additionally, Art of Problem Solving offers Python programming classes and Olympiad level classes in mathematics, physics, and chemistry, called WOOT.

Rusczyk founded and serves on the board of the nonprofit Art of Problem Solving Initiative, which manages the United States of America Mathematical Talent Search (USAMTS) and finances numerous local math initiatives around the United States. In 2012, Rusczyk won the Mathcounts distinguished alumnus award. In 2014, Rusczyk won the Paul Erdős Award from the World Federation of National Mathematics Competitions. Art of Problem Solving also has a vast community of over 500,000 math, computer science, and physics enthusiasts.

In 2020, Mathcounts was canceled due to the COVID-19 pandemic. In its stead, Art of Problem Solving hosted the online Mathcounts Week.  Art of Problem Solving also hosted the second round of the American Invitational Mathematics Examination as the American Online Invitational Mathematics Examination. Art of Problem Solving also hosted the American Mathematics Competitions from November 10–16, and had hosted the it in February 2021.

Website 
The Art of Problem Solving website hosts online math courses. Sets of problems are included which is for homework. The website also hosts a large number of forums, where users can post math problems and play math & strategy games. The Art of Problem Solving wiki contains numerous formulas and additional information. During the COVID-19 pandemic, the website additionally began hosting several math and science competitions. These include the American Mathematics Competitions, American Invitational Mathematics Examination, United States of America Mathematical Olympiad, the Putnam Competition, F=ma examination, USA Biolympiad, and Mathcounts.

Textbooks 
Richard Ruscyzk has both authored and co-authored several textbooks for students in grades 5-12, including Pre-algebra, Introduction to Algebra, Introduction to Geometry, and many others. During his studies at Princeton University, he also wrote the Art of Problem Solving Volumes 1 and 2 with Sandor Lehoczky.

Other 
Rusczyk studied chemical engineering at Princeton University and graduated Summa Cum Laude in 1993. He previously served on the board for ARML and managed the Western ARML site.

References

External links 
 The Art of Problem Solving
 The Mandelbrot Competition
 Rusczyk's blog
 The Art of Problem Solving Initiative
 USAMTS website
 Mandelbrot History

Living people
American non-fiction writers
Princeton University alumni
1971 births
Mathematics popularizers